The 1997 Oceania Women's Handball Championship was the first edition of the Oceania Handball Nations Cup, which took place in Melbourne, Australia from 22 to 23 March 1997. Entered nations were Australia, Vanuatu and New Zealand, but Vanuatu did not compete. Australia won the right to play Slovenia for a spot in the World Cup.

Table

Results
All times are local (UTC+10).

References

External links
Report on Tudor Handball

Oceania Handball Championship
1997 Oceania Women's Handball Champions Cup
1997 in Australian sport
Women's handball in Australia
1997 in women's handball
March 1997 sports events in Australia